In geometry, a Reinhardt polygon is an equilateral polygon inscribed in a Reuleaux polygon. As in the regular polygons, each vertex of a Reinhardt polygon participates in at least one defining pair of the diameter of the polygon. Reinhardt polygons with  sides exist, often with multiple forms, whenever  is not a power of two. Among all polygons with  sides, the Reinhardt polygons have the largest possible perimeter for their diameter, the largest possible width for their diameter, and the largest possible width for their perimeter. They are named after Karl Reinhardt, who studied them in 1922.

Definition and construction
A Reuleaux polygon is a convex shape with circular-arc sides, each centered on a vertex of the shape and all having the same radius; an example is the Reuleaux triangle. These shapes are curves of constant width. Some Reuleaux polygons have side lengths that are irrational multiples of each other, but if a Reuleaux polygon has sides that can be partitioned into a system of arcs of equal length, then the polygon formed as the convex hull of the endpoints of these arcs is defined as a Reinhardt polygon. Necessarily, the vertices of the underlying Reuleaux polygon are also endpoints of arcs and vertices of the Reinhardt polygon, but the Reinhardt polygon may also have additional vertices, interior to the sides of the Reuleaux polygon.

If  is a power of two, then it is not possible to form a Reinhardt polygon with  sides. If  is an odd number, then the regular polygon with  sides is a Reinhardt polygon. Any other natural number must have an odd divisor , and a Reinhardt polygon with  sides may be formed by subdividing each arc of a regular -sided Reuleaux polygon into  smaller arcs. Therefore, the possible numbers of sides of Reinhardt polygons are the polite numbers, numbers that are not powers of two. When  is an odd prime number, or two times a prime number, there is only one shape of -sided Reinhardt polygon, but all other values of  have Reinhardt polygons with multiple shapes.

Dimensions and optimality
The diameter pairs of a Reinhardt polygon form many isosceles triangles with the sides of the triangle, with apex angle , from which the dimensions of the polygon may be calculated. If the side length of a Reinhardt polygon is 1, then its perimeter is just . The diameter of the polygon (the longest distance between any two of its points) equals the side length of these isosceles triangles, . The curves of constant width of the polygon (the shortest distance between any two parallel supporting lines) equals the height of this triangle, . These polygons are optimal in three ways:
They have the largest possible perimeter among all -sided polygons with their diameter, and the smallest possible diameter among all -sided polygons with their perimeter.
They have the largest possible width among all -sided polygons with their diameter, and the smallest possible diameter among all -sided polygons with their width.
They have the largest possible width among all -sided polygons with their perimeter, and the smallest possible perimeter among all -sided polygons with their width.

The relation between perimeter and diameter for these polygons was proven by Reinhardt, and rediscovered independently multiple times. The relation between diameter and width was proven by Bezdek and Fodor in 2000; their work also investigates the optimal polygons for this problem when the number of sides is a power of two (for which Reinhardt polygons do not exist).

Symmetry and enumeration
The Reinhardt polygons that have this sort of rotational symmetry are called periodic, and Reinhardt polygons without rotational symmetry are called sporadic. If  is a semiprime, or the product of a power of two with an odd prime power, then all -sided Reinhardt polygons are periodic. In the remaining cases, when  has two distinct odd prime factors and is not the product of these two factors, sporadic Reinhardt polygons also exist.

For each , there are only finitely many distinct -sided Reinhardt polygons.

where the  term uses little O notation. However, the number of sporadic Reinhardt polygons is less well-understood, and for most values of  the total number of Reinhardt polygons is dominated by the sporadic ones.

See also
Biggest little polygon, the polygons maximizing area for their diameter

References

Types of polygons